The Second Deadly Sin (2011) is a crime novel by Swedish writer Åsa Larsson, fifth in the Rebecka Martinsson series. It was published by MacLehose Press in the UK on 1 February 2014 and in the USA on 12 August 2014.
This novel is preceded by The Fourth Deadly Sin.

Editions
 Åsa Larsson, Sacrificio a Moloch, traduzione di Katia De Marco, Marsilio, 2012. .
 Åsa Larsson, Sacrificio a Moloch, traduzione di Katia De Marco, Marsilio, 2013. .
 Åsa Larsson, Sacrificio a Moloch, traduzione di Katia De Marco, Universale Economica Feltrinelli, 2019. .

References

2011 Swedish novels
Novels by Åsa Larsson
Rebecka Martinsson books
Swedish crime novels
Albert Bonniers Förlag books
MacLehose Press books